England Made Me may refer to:

 England Made Me (novel), a 1935 novel by Graham Greene
 England Made Me (film), a 1973 film adaptation of the novel
 England Made Me, a 1991 album by Cath Carroll
 England Made Me (album), a 1998 album by Black Box Recorder